Thomas Giles, Gyles or Gilles may refer to:

Thomas Giles (pastoralist) (1820–1899), settler in South Australia
Thomas A. Giles (1916–1970), Canadian politician, Nova Scotia, 1949 to 1953
Thomas Giles, pseudonym used by American musician Tommy Giles Rogers Jr.
Thomas Gyles (fl. 1402–1406), MP for Dover
Tom Gilles (born 1962), American former professional baseball player